Ilya Medvedev (born 18 November 1982) is a Russian sprint canoer who competed since the late 2000s. He won two bronze medals in the K-2 1000 m event at the 2010 ICF Canoe Sprint World Championships in Poznań and in the K-4 1000 m event at the 2011 ICF Canoe Sprint World Championships in Szeged.

At the 2008 Summer Olympics in Beijing, Medvedev finished eighth the K-4 1000 m event.  At the 2012 Summer Olympics, he finished sixth in the K-2 1000 m and seventh in the K-4 1000 m.

References
Sports-Reference.com profile

1983 births
Canoeists at the 2008 Summer Olympics
Canoeists at the 2012 Summer Olympics
Living people
Olympic canoeists of Russia
Russian male canoeists
ICF Canoe Sprint World Championships medalists in kayak